Facing Africa is a British registered charity providing funds for the visits of teams of voluntary surgeons from the UK, Germany, France, Spain and Netherlands to Ethiopia to carry out facial reconstructive surgery on the victims of the disease noma, and the acquisition of related surgical equipment, consumables and disposables for hospitals in Addis Ababa. The charity was founded in 1998, and deals with the 10% of survivors of noma, those who have survived the early stages but who will be left with the effects of this disease. It has an office at West Stowell, Wiltshire.

History 
Facing Africa was founded in 1998 by Chris Lawrence, who decided to take action after he had heard about the devastating effects of noma. He was joined by Allan Thom, a consultant orthodontist, and after careful consideration how to approach the problem, it was agreed to put together occasional expeditions to a chosen location in Africa and operate as often as volunteers could be found and as often as could be financially funded. The research was completed and an attempt to establish vital links with doctors, surgeons and hospital administrators made. In 2000 Facing Africa joined the Sokoto NOMA Project. The decision was taken that Facing Africa would work together with the Dutch Noma Foundation, AWD-Stiftung Kinderhilfe and Resurge (former Interplast) and take part in the surgical missions offering financial, logistical and medical support and assistance in Sokoto in Sokoto, Nigeria. Facing Africa partially funded 4 annual surgical team missions to Sokoto as well as donating a mini bus, X-ray machine and other essential equipment. In October 2007 Facing Africa organised its first team mission to Ethiopia where the surgeons carried out a reconstructive facial surgery at the government YEKATIT 12 hospital in Addis Ababa. Since that time Facing Africa organises 1–2 missions to Ethiopia carrying out between 45–55 facial reconstructions  Facing Africa, along with other NGO's and charities dealing with this problem, has been recognised as one of the driving forces of the fight against noma.

Missions 
Every year Facing Africa sends top specialists to treat those affected by noma. Each team is made up of 3–4 surgeons (plastic, maxillo-facial and craniofacial), 2–3 anaesthetists and nurses who spend two weeks carrying out a variety of complex and lengthy facial reconstructive operations, including free flaps (microsurgery) and pedicles, in Addis Ababa. Facing Africa aims to provide the highest levels of reconstructive surgery, anaesthesia, as well as pre and post op wound care for the people affected by noma or other severe facial deformities. Teams of volunteer specialists continuously support Facing Africa’s efforts, among others David Dunaway, head of craniofacial surgery at Great Ormond Street Children's Hospital, Neil Bulstrode, consultant plastic surgeon at GOSH, Hiroshi Nishikawa, consultant paediatric plastic and craniofacial surgeon, Kelvin Mizen, consultant maxillo-facial surgeon, Professor Dominique Martin, consultant plastic surgeon. To ensure the best possible environment for its patients Facing Africa works closely with MCM hospital in Ethiopia and funds construction and equipment of aftercare facilities in local Cheshire Home, where patients stay after their operations. Facing Africa local staff in Ethiopia work in remoute rural areas of the country to locate and support children and adults with severe facial deformities caused by noma and other diseases.
Being aware that it is necessary to improve the surgical capacity and nursing in Ethiopia, Facing Africa also creates learning and training opportunities for local health professionals. Facing Africa encourages Ethiopian surgeons to join their teams during surgery in order to improve their skill, learn new and complex techniques and procedures and the use of up to date surgical equipment. From 2013, the Royal College of Anaesthetists funded the Facing Africa Anaesthetic Fellowship, to enable a less experienced anaesthetist to join Facing Africa consultants in Ethiopia and learn difficult airway management skills.

Cheshire Home (Menagesha) 
In 2007, the British Cheshire Homes charity agreed to accommodate 50 of Facing Africa's noma patients for two weeks prior to their reconstructive surgery, and for a further 2–3 weeks rehabilitation and post-operative care. Children from remote rural parts of Ethiopia are brought to The Cheshire two weeks before the team of volunteer surgeons and anaesthetists arrives. Facing Africa enlists the help of two British nurses and an Ethiopian doctor to volunteer for eight-week missions at The Cheshire where they prepare all the patients for their long and complex surgical reconstruction. This includes organising pre-op' blood tests, X-rays/CT scans, nutrition assessments and general pre-op' care of young people who had never been outside their villages. When the patients return to The Cheshire after their operations, the two nurses have to monitor and treat wound care, infections, hygiene and general rehabilitation with antibiotics and pain relief. In 2009 Facing Africa funded the building of two additional dormitories, each with 10 beds for male and female patients.

January 2012 mission 
January 2012 brought together a larger than usual team with 20 participants, including 2 craniofacial, 1 plastic and 1 maxillo-facial surgeons, 4 anaesthetists, 3 operating room nurses and 3 ward nurses. In addition, Facing Africa sent 2 British wound-care nurses who spent 8 weeks at the Cheshire Home (Menagesha) taking care of the patients pre and post operation care. All members of the team flew from London to Addis Ababa on Ethiopian Airlines.
On arrival, the team transferred from Addis airport to the Cheshire Home where they spent the day selecting patients from a gathering of 58 Ethiopians with severe facial deformities caused by noma, ameloblastoma, neurofibromatosis, tumours, leprosy (covered) and trauma and encephalocele. The following day was devoted to unpacking 38 cases and bags of drugs, consumables, surgical equipment and disposables as well as the selection of 43 patients who would undergo facial reconstruction over the coming 11 days at the MCM Korean Hospital in Addis. Facing Africa's January 2012 mission to Addis Ababa was covered by local Ethiopian TV, broadcast focusing on teams work in Ethiopia. By the end of the mission, the team carried out 7 free flaps (microsurgery), 5 sub-mental flaps and a number of facial corrections and follow-ups to previous missions.

Raising awareness 
Facing Africa's work was featured in two BBC World Service programmes on noma and the treatment of patients from remote regions. In November 2007, a documentary film made by the BBC's Inside Out featured a group of severely affected patients from several regions of Ethiopia who underwent surgical treatment by a team of UK medical volunteers, organised by Facing Africa.

In 2008, the charity cooperated in the making of a BBC documentary Make Me a New Face: Hope for Africa’s Hidden Children initiated by Ben Fogle. The charity also supports various research and publications about noma, such as Surgical Treatment of Noma by K.E. Bos and K.W. Marck. Facing Africa's surgical work is presented in medical journals and conferences by its medical volunteers, not only benefiting the poorest people in Ethiopia but also serving to expand academic knowledge of complex surgery, anaesthesia  and related issues.

Fundraising events 
 Marathon des Sables
 British 10K London run

References

External links 
  
 Surgeon's mission of hope for disfigured children, Yorkshire Post (2010)

Charities based in Wiltshire
Health in Wiltshire
Health charities in the United Kingdom
Foreign charities operating in Ethiopia
Oral and maxillofacial surgery organizations